Provincial Road 304 (PR 304) is a provincial road in eastern Manitoba, Canada.  It begins at PTH 59/PTH 12 south of Grand Beach and runs to Powerview-Pine Falls at the PTH 11 junction.  Near the town, PR 304 crosses the Winnipeg River at the Pine Falls Generating Station, operated by Manitoba Hydro.  From there, PR 304 heads north and then east to the community of Bissett, before terminating at Provincial Road 314 near the northern boundary of Nopiming Provincial Park.

Provincial Roads 304, 313, 314, and 315, along with PTH 11, form a loop that provides access to several remote communities, First Nations reserves, and provincial parks on the eastern side of Lake Winnipeg.  PR 304 is also used as a south terminus for winter roads to northern Manitoba.

References

External links 
Manitoba Official Map

304